Troiano, Troyano or Troyanos may refer to:

People

Troiano
 Troiano Acquaviva d’Aragona (1696–1747), Italian cardinal and Catholic archbishop
 Anthony Troiano (born 1988), Australian musician
 Bill Troiano (born 1951), American tuba player
 Domenic Troiano (1946–2005), Canadian rock guitarist
 Massimo Troiano (died c. 1570), Italian Renaissance composer, poet, and chronicler
 Michele Troiano (born 1985), Italian football player
 Sophie Troiano (born 1987), British fencer

Troyano
 Alina Troyano, stage name Carmelita Tropicana, Cuban-American actress
 Juan Santisteban Troyano (born 1936), Spanish footballer

Troyanos
 Tatiana Troyanos (1938–1993), American mezzo-soprano

Places
 Troiano (Bisenti), a place in Abruzzo, Italy

See also

Troian (disambiguation)
Troyan (disambiguation)
De bello Troiano, an epic poem in Latin